Grida Duma (born 11 June 1977) is an Albanian former politician, lecturer, and journalist. A member of the Democratic Party of Albania, she served as the Deputy Minister of European integration in the Berisha cabinet in the years 2011–2013.

Education
Grida is graduated with distinction in Sociology from the Faculty of Social Sciences of the University of Tirana. She has successfully completed her post graduate studies in the Central European University in Hungary and the University of Nebraska–Lincoln in the United States. She received a MA in Business Administration from the University of Tirana and holds a Doctorate Degree in Economics.

She worked as a professor and lecturer for different Universities in Albania, including the University of Tirana where she was also head of the Department of Sociology in the Faculty of Social Sciences.

Political career
She started her political career as the Deputy Minister of European integration during the years 2011–2013.
On the local elections of 2015 it was rumored that she would candidate for Mayor in Tirana but later was announced her candidacy for the Municipality of Durres. She failed to win the popular vote to become mayor.

Since 2014, after losing the elections she became the Secretary for Public Relations of the Democratic Party of Albania. She is a prominent figure among the Democrats and a close supporter of the current leader of the Democratic Party, Lulzim Basha

Member of the Parliament
In 2017 Duma was elected for the Democratic Party at the Albanian Parliament representing Tirana county. 
In September she was elected as spokesperson of the parliamentary group of the Democratic Party.
From durres Albania (Cezma Ferres)

On November 7, 2022, Duma announced the end of her political career, resigning from her position as Member of Parliament. Shortly thereafter, it was announced that she would return to her journalistic career, by hosting a political talk show called "Top Story by Grida Duma" on Top Channel.

Personal life

Duma was married for 11 years with an Albanian diplomat and lecturer called Ilir Shqina, with whom she has a son. The couple divorced in March 2019. 

Duma was speculated in Albanian media of being in a relationship with fellow Democratic Party MP Ervin Salianji though neither of the two ever confirmed this.

References

1977 births
Living people
People from Durrës
Democratic Party of Albania politicians
University of Tirana alumni
Members of the Parliament of Albania
Women members of the Parliament of Albania
University of Nebraska–Lincoln alumni
21st-century Albanian women politicians
21st-century Albanian politicians